The Thunder 380 is a lightweight, relatively small semi-automatic pistol series chambered in the popular .380 ACP caliber made by Argentine firearms manufacturer Bersa, S.A.

It is similar in design to the Walther PPK, but also has design features vaguely in common with the compact Beretta 70 pistol; although it sells for about half the price of a PPK.

Development
The Thunder 380 is part of the current Bersa product lineup that also includes the Thunder 32, Thunder 22, Thunder 22–6, Thunder 380 Deluxe,Thunder 380 Combat,  Thunder 9, Mini Thunder 9, Mini Thunder 40, and Mini Thunder 45. A light variant of the Thunder 380, called the "Concealed Carry" model (or 380CC), and a 15-round capable "Bersa Thunder 380 Plus" were released by Bersa in the United States, and variants "Firestorm 380" and "Firestorm 22" are sold by Firestorm SGS of New Jersey; assembled from parts manufactured by Bersa.

Intended market
The Thunder 380 is suited for concealed carry due to its small size and rounded trigger guard. One reviewer calls it "very easy to maintain". The Thunder 380 is quite popular in many South American countries, where the .380 ACP is often the most powerful cartridge allowed for civilians.

A number of military and law enforcement forces have included Bersa 380s in their inventory, including the Ecuadorian Air Force.

Design advantages
The Thunder 380 has a light aluminum alloy frame that reduces weight for easier carry, yet the pistol still retains enough mass (weight) to help tame recoil. The magazines are designed with an extra section of grip, so that all fingers of the firing hand are accommodated. The blowback, fixed-barrel design theoretically aids accuracy, and it appears that the vast majority of Thunder 380 users report favorably on that issue. The nearly straight-in alignment of the chamber and the topmost cartridge in the magazine seems to be responsible for the pistol's reliable chambering and cycling. The frame features a long rearward tang over the grips, which effectively protects the shooter's thumb web from hammer-bite or slide-bite. There are several safety features built into the Thunder 380: a slide mounted manual safety and decocker that blocks the hammer, a magazine disconnect safety that prevents firing if a magazine is not inserted, a long double-action (DA) first trigger pull, an inertial firing pin, and (in some models) an integral key-operated trigger lock. Some versions also feature an automatic firing pin block. The pistol has a rear sight windage adjustment.

References

External links
Manual
Review of the Bersa Thunder 380 at Gunblast.com
Ballistics By The Inch performance test including the Bersa/Firestorm .380.

Semi-automatic pistols of Argentina
.380 ACP semi-automatic pistols
Bersa firearms